North Sea Ferries was a ferry company which operated between 1965 and 1996 when it was merged into P&O Operations (P&O North Sea Ferries), it had routes from Hull to Rotterdam (Europort) and Zeebrugge. P&O North Sea Ferries was then merged with P&O Ferries in 2003. In 1987, the Princess Margaret Ferry Terminal was built under the operation of North Sea Ferries. The building is now under the ownership of Associated British Ports and is operated by P&O Ferries.

Fleet

References

External links
 North Sea Ferries (fleet postcards)

Ferry companies of Belgium
Ferry companies of England
Ferry companies of the Netherlands
Defunct shipping companies of the United Kingdom
Transport companies established in 1965
Transport companies disestablished in 1996